Qazi Mahalleh may refer to:
 Qazi Mahalleh, Gilan